Kallahalli is a village in Mysore district of Karnataka state, India. It is the home village of Devraj Urs former chief minister of Karnataka. It is commonly mistaken to be his birthplace, which is actually Bettadatunga located about 26 kilometres away.

Location
Kallahalli is located between Hunsur and Gonikoppal in the Mysore district.

Tourist attractions
Kallahalli Srinivasa temple is a tourist attraction in Kallahalli.

Post office
There is a post office in Kallahalli and the postal code is 571105.

Administration
Kallahalli is administered as part of Hunsur Taluk in Mysore district.

Villages and suburbs
 Kaggere - 
 Thippur - 
 Mudalakopalu - 
 Hompapura -

References

Villages in Mysore district